The table of years in architecture is a tabular display of all years in architecture, for overview and quick navigation to any year.

Contents: 2000s - 1900s - 1800s - 1700s - 1600s - 1500s - 1400s - 1300s - 1200s - 1100s - 1000s - Other

2000s in architecture

2000   2001   2002   2003   2004   2005   2006   2007   2008   2009   2010   2011   2012   2013   2014   2015   2016   2017   2018   2019   
2020 2021 2022 2023

1900s in architecture

1900   1901   1902   1903   1904   1905   1906   1907   1908   1909
1910   1911   1912   1913   1914   1915   1916   1917   1918   1919
1920   1921   1922   1923   1924   1925   1926   1927   1928   1929
1930   1931   1932   1933   1934   1935   1936   1937   1938   1939
1940   1941   1942   1943   1944   1945   1946   1947   1948   1949
1950   1951   1952   1953   1954   1955   1956   1957   1958   1959
1960   1961   1962   1963   1964   1965   1966   1967   1968   1969
1970   1971   1972   1973   1974   1975   1976   1977   1978   1979
1980   1981   1982   1983   1984   1985   1986   1987   1988   1989
1990   1991   1992   1993   1994   1995   1996   1997   1998   1999

1800s in architecture

1800   1801   1802   1803   1804   1805   1806   1807   1808   1809
1810   1811   1812   1813   1814   1815   1816   1817   1818   1819
1820   1821   1822   1823   1824   1825   1826   1827   1828   1829
1830   1831   1832   1833   1834   1835   1836   1837   1838   1839
1840   1841   1842   1843   1844   1845   1846   1847   1848   1849
1850   1851   1852   1853   1854   1855   1856   1857   1858   1859
1860   1861   1862   1863   1864   1865   1866   1867   1868   1869
1870   1871   1872   1873   1874   1875   1876   1877   1878   1879
1880   1881   1882   1883   1884   1885   1886   1887   1888   1889
1890   1891   1892   1893   1894   1895   1896   1897   1898   1899

1700s in architecture

1700   1701   1702   1703   1704   1705   1706   1707   1708   1709
1710   1711   1712   1713   1714   1715   1716   1717   1718   1719
1720   1721   1722   1723   1724   1725   1726   1727   1728   1729
1730   1731   1732   1733   1734   1735   1736   1737   1738   1739
1740   1741   1742   1743   1744   1745   1746   1747   1748   1749
1750   1751   1752   1753   1754   1755   1756   1757   1758   1759
1760   1761   1762   1763   1764   1765   1766   1767   1768   1769
1770   1771   1772   1773   1774   1775   1776   1777   1778   1779
1780   1781   1782   1783   1784   1785   1786   1787   1788   1789
1790   1791   1792   1793   1794   1795   1796   1797   1798   1799

1600s in architecture

1600   1601   1602   1603   1604   1605   1606   1607   1608   1609
1610   1611   1612   1613   1614   1615   1616   1617   1618   1619
1620   1621   1622   1623   1624   1625   1626   1627   1628   1629
1630   1631   1632   1633   1634   1635   1636   1637   1638   1639
1640   1641   1642   1643   1644   1645   1646   1647   1648   1649
1650   1651   1652   1653   1654   1655   1656   1657   1658   1659
1660   1661   1662   1663   1664   1665   1666   1667   1668   1669
1670   1671   1672   1673   1674   1675   1676   1677   1678   1679
1680   1681   1682   1683   1684   1685   1686   1687   1688   1689
1690   1691   1692   1693   1694   1695   1696   1697   1698   1699
Redirected by decade: 
1600s - 1610s - 1620s - 1630s - 1640s - 1650s - 1660s - 1670s - 1680s - 1690s

1500s in architecture

1500   1501   1502   1503   1504   1505   1506   1507   1508   1509
1510   1511   1512   1513   1514   1515   1516   1517   1518   1519
1520   1521   1522   1523   1524   1525   1526   1527   1528   1529
1530   1531   1532   1533   1534   1535   1536   1537   1538   1539
1540   1541   1542   1543   1544   1545   1546   1547   1548   1549
1550   1551   1552   1553   1554   1555   1556   1557   1558   1559
1560   1561   1562   1563   1564   1565   1566   1567   1568   1569
1570   1571   1572   1573   1574   1575   1576   1577   1578   1579
1580   1581   1582   1583   1584   1585   1586   1587   1588   1589
1590   1591   1592   1593   1594   1595   1596   1597   1598   1599
Redirected by decade: 1500s - 1510s - 1520s - 1530s - 1540s - 1550s - 1560s - 1570s - 1580s - 1590s

1400s in architecture

1400   1401   1402   1403   1404   1405   1406   1407   1408   1409
1410   1411   1412   1413   1414   1415   1416   1417   1418   1419
1420   1421   1422   1423   1424   1425   1426   1427   1428   1429
1430   1431   1432   1433   1434   1435   1436   1437   1438   1439
1440   1441   1442   1443   1444   1445   1446   1447   1448   1449
1450   1451   1452   1453   1454   1455   1456   1457   1458   1459
1460   1461   1462   1463   1464   1465   1466   1467   1468   1469
1470   1471   1472   1473   1474   1475   1476   1477   1478   1479
1480   1481   1482   1483   1484   1485   1486   1487   1488   1489
1490   1491   1492   1493   1494   1495   1496   1497   1498   1499
Redirected by decade: 1400s - 1410s - 1420s - 1430s - 1440s - 1450s - 1460s - 1470s - 1480s - 1490s

1300s in architecture

1300   1301   1302   1303   1304   1305   1306   1307   1308   1309
1310   1311   1312   1313   1314   1315   1316   1317   1318   1319
1320   1321   1322   1323   1324   1325   1326   1327   1328   1329
1330   1331   1332   1333   1334   1335   1336   1337   1338   1339
1340   1341   1342   1343   1344   1345   1346   1347   1348   1349
1350   1351   1352   1353   1354   1355   1356   1357   1358   1359
1360   1361   1362   1363   1364   1365   1366   1367   1368   1369
1370   1371   1372   1373   1374   1375   1376   1377   1378   1379
1380   1381   1382   1383   1384   1385   1386   1387   1388   1389
1390   1391   1392   1393   1394   1395   1396   1397   1398   1399
Redirected by decade: 1300s - 1310s - 1320s - 1330s - 1340s - 1350s - 1360s - 1370s - 1380s - 1390s.
Redirected to century from each decade:   14th century in architecture.

1200s in architecture

1200   1201   1202   1203   1204   1205   1206   1207   1208   1209
1210   1211   1212   1213   1214   1215   1216   1217   1218   1219
1220   1221   1222   1223   1224   1225   1226   1227   1228   1229
1230   1231   1232   1233   1234   1235   1236   1237   1238   1239
1240   1241   1242   1243   1244   1245   1246   1247   1248   1249
1250   1251   1252   1253   1254   1255   1256   1257   1258   1259
1260   1261   1262   1263   1264   1265   1266   1267   1268   1269
1270   1271   1272   1273   1274   1275   1276   1277   1278   1279
1280   1281   1282   1283   1284   1285   1286   1287   1288   1289
1290   1291   1292   1293   1294   1295   1296   1297   1298   1299
Redirected by decade: 1200s - 1210s - 1220s - 1230s - 1240s - 1250s - 1260s - 1270s - 1280s - 1290s

1100s in architecture

1100s - 1110s - 1120s - 1130s - 1140s - 1150s - 1160s - 1170s - 1180s - 1190s

1000s in architecture

1000s - 1010s - 1020s - 1030s - 1040s - 1050s - 1060s - 1070s - 1080s - 1090s

Other years in architecture
2nd Millennium AD

20th century in architecture - 19th century in architecture - 18th century in architecture - 17th century in architecture - 16th century in architecture
15th century in architecture - 14th century in architecture - 13th century in architecture - 12th century in architecture - 11th century in architecture

1st Millennium AD

10th century in architecture - 9th century in architecture - 8th century in architecture - 7th century in architecture - 6th century in architecture
5th century in architecture - 4th century in architecture - 3rd century in architecture - 2nd century in architecture - 1st century in architecture

1st Millennium BC

1st century BC in architecture - 2nd century BC in architecture - 3rd century BC in architecture - 4th century BC in architecture - 5th century BC in architecture
6th century BC in architecture - 7th century BC in architecture - 8th century BC in architecture - 9th century BC in architecture - 10th century BC in architecture

2nd Millennium BC

11th century BC in architecture - 12th century BC in architecture - 13th century BC in architecture - 14th century BC in architecture - 15th century BC in architecture
16th century BC in architecture - 17th century BC in architecture - 18th century BC in architecture - 19th century BC in architecture - 20th century BC in architecture

3rd Millennium BC

21st century BC in architecture - 22nd century BC in architecture - 23rd century BC in architecture - 24th century BC in architecture - 25th century BC in architecture
26th century BC in architecture - 27th century BC in architecture - 28th century BC in architecture - 29th century BC in architecture - 30th century BC in architecture

Neolithic

4th millennium BC in architecture

See also

Timeline of architecture

Notes

 
 
Tables of years